The  was held on 30 December 2021.

Nominations and awards were announced by the organizers on 19 November. Like the previous award ceremony, the Best Album Award, Songwriting Award, Composition Award, Merit Award, and Planning Award were not presented due to the COVID-19 pandemic.

Presenters 
 Riho Yoshioka
 Shinichiro Azumi (TBS Announcer)

Winners

Grand Prix
 Da-iCE – "Citrus"
 Artist: Da-iCE
 Lyrics: Taiki Kudo, Sota Hanamura
 Music: Kaz Kuwamura, Shōgo Nakayama
 Arranger: Shōgo Nakayama, TomoLow

Excellent Work Awards
 LiSA - "Akeboshi"
 Junretsu - "Kimi ga Soba ni Iru kara"
 Nogizaka46 – "Gomen ne Fingers Crossed"
 Da-iCE - "Citrus"
 NiziU - "Take a Picture"
 Da Pump - "Dream on the Street"
 AKB48 - "Nemohamo Rumor"
 Daichi Miura – "Backwards"
 Kiyoshi Hikawa – "Happy!"
 Awesome City Club - "Wasurena"

Best New Artist
 Macaroni Enpitsu

New Artist Awards
 INI
 Taeko
 Macaroni Enpitsu
 Luca Mochizuki

Best Vocal Performance
 Misia

Special Award
 Ado
 Bank Band
 Takashi Matsumoto
 Yoasobi

Japan Composer's Association Award
 Hiroshi Takeshima

Special Achievement Award
 Makoto Kawaguchi (composer)
 Makoto Kitajo (lyricist)
 Asei Kobayashi (composer)
 Masatoshi Sakai (producer)
 Sumiko Sakamoto (singer)
 Jerry Fujio (singer)
 Koichi Sugiyama (composer)
 Jun Suzuki (composer)
 Takeshi Terauchi (guitarist)

Special International Music Award
 BTS

References 

2021
2021 music awards
2021 in Japanese music
Impact of the COVID-19 pandemic on the music industry